The 11th Krajina Division was a Yugoslav Partisan division that fought against the Germans, Independent State of Croatia (NDH) and Chetniks in occupied Democratic Federal Yugoslavia during World War II. The term krajiška in its name refers to Bosanska Krajina.

The division was formed on 1 May 1943, with 5th and 12th Krajina Brigade in its composition. It was subordinated to the 2nd Bosnia Corps, and on 19 July 1943 it was re-subordinated to 2nd Bosnia (later: Third) Corps.

As part of the 3rd Corps it spent August 1944 engaged in hard fighting against the 13th Waffen Mountain Division of the SS Handschar (1st Croatian) in eastern Bosnia.

Notes

References
 
 
 
 
 
 

Divisions of the Yugoslav Partisans
Military units and formations established in 1944
Military units and formations disestablished in 1945